The General Strike is Anti-Flag's ninth studio album. The album was released on March 20, 2012. The album marks the band's second release for SideOneDummy Records. The first single from the album, "The Neoliberal Anthem" was released to the band's Facebook page in January 2012. The band released a music video for single "This is the New Sound" on March 27, 2012.

Writing and production
In June 2011, Justin Sane announced that the band had begun working on material for their new studio album under the working title, Magnum, which they hoped would be released in the fall. However the change in title led some fans to speculate if it was due to the Occupy Wall Street movement and protests around the world.

Track listing

Personnel 
Anti-Flag
 Justin Sane – guitar, vocals
 Chris #2 – bass, vocals
 Chris Head – guitar, vocals
 Pat Thetic – drums

Charts

References

External links 
 Anti-Flag on SideOneDummy

Anti-Flag albums
2012 albums
SideOneDummy Records albums